Christopher Caluag (born 16 December 1988 in the United States) is a Filipino American BMX racer and civil engineer who competes for the Philippines internationally. He won a silver medal at the 2013 Southeast Asian Games and participated at the 2014 Asian Games.

Early life

Caluag was born to Daniel Ramos Caluag and Isabelita Manabat Caluag. Daniel Ramos was a respiratory therapist from Malolos, Bulacan and Isabelita was a registered nurse from Licab, Nueva Ecija. His parents migrated separately and met in California. Daniel Ramos migrated first to Guam at a young age before migrating again to the US mainland. Caluag and his older brother, Daniel were born in the United States.

His brother Daniel resides in with his family in Kentucky. Daniel bikes with Christopher whenever Daniel visits him in California.

Career
Christopher took up BMX following his older brother.

References

1988 births
Living people
BMX riders
Filipino male cyclists
American male cyclists
American sportspeople of Filipino descent
Cyclists at the 2014 Asian Games
Filipino engineers
Southeast Asian Games medalists in cycling
Southeast Asian Games silver medalists for the Philippines
Cyclists at the 2018 Asian Games
Competitors at the 2013 Southeast Asian Games
Asian Games competitors for the Philippines